The Bow Brook is a substantial brook that flows for  through Worcestershire, England. It is a lower tributary of the River Avon which it joins near Defford downstream of Eckington Bridge. Its principal tributaries include the Stoulton, Dean, and Seeley brooks.

Course
It rises near Upper Bentley to the west of Redditch, and flows due south through Feckenham beyond which it turns west to reach Shell, where it is known as the Shell Brook, and onwards to Himbleton. It continues in a southerly direction flowing past Huddington and Upton Snodsbury where it is crossed by the A422, near Broughton Hackett, and then past Peopleton beyond which it is crossed by the A44. The brook is forded by a minor road between Walcot and Pinvin, here it turns south-west, past Ufnell Bridge on the B4084 until it reaches Besford Bridge where it is measured. It is bridged by the A4104 before it passes Defford the last village on its course, downstream of which it joins the Warwickshire Avon.

Hydrology
The flow of the Bow Brook has been measured using a weir, in the lower reaches at Besford Bridge since 1969.
The lowest flows were measured in August 1976.

Land use is mainly agricultural, consisting of arable, horticulture and grassland, with some woodland.

See also
List of rivers of England

References

External links

Bow Brook water levels at Besford Bridge
Bow Brook water levels at Feckenham

Rivers of Worcestershire
1Bow